Patrick Briaud (born 6 February 1983) is an American professional tennis player.

College career
Briaud played college tennis for the California Golden Bears.

Pro career
Briaud's professional endeavors had only limited success, in doubles. He won two minor league Challenger-level doubles events in 2007, and had only one ATP Tour level appearance in his career. This was a quarterfinal loss in the 2007 Mumbai tournament, partnered with Wesley Moodie.

World TeamTennis
Briaud was a member of the 2008 New York Buzz team, which won the King Trophy as World TeamTennis champions.

See also

References

External links
 
 

1983 births
Living people
California Golden Bears men's tennis players
American male tennis players
Tennis people from Texas
Tennis people from California